Edward Keane (May 28, 1884 – October 12, 1959) was an American film actor. He appeared in more than 300 films between 1921 and 1955.

Selected filmography

 The Supreme Passion (1921) – Dr. Jennings
 The Runaway Bride (1930) – Policeman (uncredited)
 Fast and Loose (1930) – Maitre d' (uncredited)
 Stolen Heaven (1931) – Detective Morgan
 Secrets of a Secretary (1931) – Albany Hotel Manager (uncredited)
 His Woman (1931) – Boatswain (uncredited)
 The Cheat (1931) – Defense Attorney
 Ann Carver's Profession (1933) – Harrison (uncredited)
 I Have Lived (1933) – Leading Man
 Headline Shooter (1933) – Joe Burnett (uncredited)
 One Year Later (1933) – Grant (uncredited)
 Bureau of Missing Persons (1933) – Hotel Manager (uncredited)
 I Loved a Woman (1933) – Businessman at Meeting (uncredited)
 Aggie Appleby, Maker of Men (1933) – Construction Boss (uncredited)
 After Tonight (1933) – Spy R9 (uncredited)
 College Coach (1933) – Shoe Company Executive (uncredited)
 Female (1933) – Department Head (uncredited)
 From Headquarters (1933) – Detective (uncredited)
 Blood Money (1933) – Pool Player – $1000 Bettor (uncredited)
 Havana Widows (1933) – El Havana Hotel Desk Clerk (uncredited)
 I Am Suzanne! (1933) – Theatre Manager
 Massacre (1934) – Prosecutor (uncredited)
 Wonder Bar (1934) – Captain (uncredited)
 Gambling Lady (1934) – The Duke (uncredited)
 Registered Nurse (1934) – Gossip at Club (uncredited)
 The Crime of Helen Stanley (1934) – Mr. Richardson – Studio Manager (uncredited)
 Born to Be Bad (1934) – Admirer at Nightclub (uncredited)
 The Merry Frinks (1934) – Truant Officer
 Now I'll Tell (1934) – Gangster (uncredited)
 Green Eyes (1934) – Raynor
 Stamboul Quest (1934) – Annemarie's Kabarett 'Date' (uncredited)
 Midnight Alibi (1934) – Special Officer in Flashback (uncredited)
 The Count of Monte Cristo (1934) – Bertrand (uncredited)
 Housewife (1934) – William's Lawyer (uncredited)
 One Exciting Adventure (1934) – Hotel manager
 One Night of Love (1934) – Metropolitan Stage Director (uncredited)
 Desirable (1934) – First Playgoer (uncredited)
 Girl in Danger (1934) – Thornton
 Kansas City Princess (1934) – Plaza Garden Captain (uncredited)
 British Agent (1934) – Dr. S. Prohoroff (uncredited)
 A Lost Lady (1934) – The Murderer (uncredited)
 Wake Up and Dream (1934) – (uncredited)
 Gentlemen Are Born (1934) – First Broker (uncredited)
 Jealousy (1934) – District Attorney (uncredited)
 I Am a Thief (1934) – Second Train Conductor (uncredited)
 Broadway Bill  (1934) – Headwaiter (uncredited)
 Sing Sing Nights (1934) – Chang (uncredited)
 Mills of the Gods (1934) – Morgan
 Behind the Evidence (1935) – Hackett
 Red Hot Tires (1935) – Defense Attorney (uncredited)
 The Woman in Red (1935) – Horse Show Ring Master (uncredited)
 The Whole Town's Talking (1935) – U.S. Deputy Attorney (uncredited)
 Naughty Marietta (1935) – Major Bonnell (uncredited)
 Public Opinion (1935) – Paul's Attorney
 Circumstantial Evidence (1935) – Judge Samuels
 G Men (1935) – Bank Teller (uncredited)
 Go Into Your Dance (1935) – Producer #3 (uncredited)
 Whispering Smith Speaks (1935) – Rebstock
 Border Brigands (1935) – Inspector Jim Barry, RCMP
 Stranded (1935) – Doctor (uncredited)
 Hard Rock Harrigan (1935) – Dr. Wagner
 Front Page Woman (1935) – Reporter (uncredited)
 The Murder Man (1935) – Joe – Editor (uncredited)
 The Irish in Us (1935) – Doctor (uncredited)
 Orchids to You (1935) – Banker (uncredited)
 Manhattan Butterfly (1935)
 Page Miss Glory (1935) – Advertising Man (uncredited)
 Shipmates Forever (1935) – Doctor on Airplane (uncredited)
 Metropolitan (1935) – Throat Specialist (uncredited)
 The Case of the Missing Man (1935) – Photo Customer (uncredited)
 Three Kids and a Queen (1935) – Gangster (uncredited)
 The Payoff (1935) – Frank (uncredited)
 A Night at the Opera (1935) – Ship's Captain
 Another Face (1935) – Casting Director (uncredited)
 Stars Over Broadway (1935) – Ford (uncredited)
 Frisco Kid (1935) – Contractor (uncredited)
 Show Them No Mercy! (1935) – Doctor (uncredited)
 Man of Iron (1935) – Mortgage Man
 Dangerous (1935) – Doctor (uncredited)
 Exclusive Story (1936) – Al Brown (uncredited)
 It Had to Happen (1936) – Politician (uncredited)
 The Farmer in the Dell (1936) – Robert F. 'Bob' Heath (uncredited)
 Colleen (1936) – Mr. Edwards (uncredited)
 The Singing Kid (1936) – IRS Agent Potter (uncredited)
 Mr. Deeds Goes to Town (1936) – Board Member (uncredited)
 The Drag-Net (1936) – Asst. District Attorney Arthur Hill
 For the Service (1936) – Captain Murphy
 The Princess Comes Across (1936) – Chief Purser (uncredited)
 The Golden Arrow (1936) – Bixby (uncredited)
 Parole! (1936) – District Attorney (uncredited)
 The Devil-Doll (1936) – Gendarme (uncredited)
 Anthony Adverse (1936) – Officer (uncredited)
 Jailbreak (1936) – Attorney (uncredited)
 Missing Girls (1936) – District Attorney
 Down the Stretch (1936) – Fred Yates (uncredited)
 The Man Who Lived Twice (1936) – Police Commissioner (uncredited)
 Gambling with Souls (1936) – Attorney
 Mummy's Boys (1936) – Ship's Captain (uncredited)
 Legion of Terror (1936) – Governor (uncredited)
 Can This Be Dixie? (1936) – Mr. Hancock (uncredited)
 California Mail (1936) – Thompson
 The Boss Rider of Gun Creek (1936) – Lawyer
 We Who Are About to Die (1937) – Ed Stanley (uncredited)
 Westbound Mail (1937) – 'Gun' Barlow
 Once a Doctor (1937) – Captain Littlejohn, S.S. Orlando
 Time Out for Romance (1937) – Stanhope (uncredited)
 When You're in Love (1937) – Stage Manager (uncredited)
 Her Husband Lies (1937) – Second Investigator (uncredited)
 Seventh Heaven (1937) – Gendarme
 I Promise to Pay (1937) – Mike Reardon
 Charlie Chan at the Olympics (1937) – Army Colonel (uncredited)
 San Quentin (1937) – 2nd Detective (uncredited)
 The Californian (1937) – Marshal Morse
 High, Wide and Handsome (1937) – Jones (uncredited)
 Reported Missing (1937) – Inspector Rhinock (uncredited)
 Confession (1937) – Cabaret Manager (voice, uncredited)
 That Certain Woman (1937) – Opposing Counsel (scenes deleted)
 The Firefly (1937) – French Chief of Staff (uncredited)
 Fit for a King (1937) – Reception Guest (uncredited)
 Dangerously Yours (1937) – Bronson (uncredited)
 Madame X (1937) – Gendarme at Villa (uncredited)
 Alcatraz Island (1937) – U.S. Attorney Crandall (uncredited)
 Hollywood Round-Up (1937) – Lew Wallace
 Submarine D-1 (1937) – Captain on Battleship (uncredited)
 Checkers (1937) – Paddock Judge (uncredited)
 Missing Witnesses (1937) – District Attorney (uncredited)
 You're a Sweetheart (1937) – Backstage Reporter (uncredited)
 Wells Fargo (1937) – Salmon P. Chase – Secretary of the Treasury (uncredited)
 Sergeant Murphy (1938) – Major Biddle (uncredited)
 In Old Chicago (1938) – Politician in Jack's Office (uncredited)
 The Invisible Menace (1938) – Officer at Dolman's Hearing (uncredited)
 International Settlement (1938) – Captain (uncredited)
 Gold Is Where You Find It (1938) – San Francisco Bar Patron (uncredited)
 The Baroness and the Butler (1938) – Guard (uncredited)
 Love on a Budget (1938) – Bank Manager (uncredited)
 Extortion (1938) – Brooks (uncredited)
 Alexander's Ragtime Band (1938) – Army Major (uncredited)
 Josette (1938) – Doorman (uncredited)
 Speed to Burn (1938) – Police Chief (uncredited)
 Border G-Man (1938) – Colonel Christie
 The Toy Wife (1938) – Auctioneer (uncredited)
 Marie Antoinette (1938) – General (uncredited)
 The Shopworn Angel (1938) – Army Captain (uncredited)
 I Am the Law (1938) – Witness (uncredited)
 You Can't Take It with You (1938) – Board Member (uncredited)
 Slander House (1938) – George Horton
 Shadows Over Shanghai (1938) – American Consul
 Girls on Probation (1938) – Mr. Bob Brian (uncredited)
 The Great Waltz (1938) – Officer (uncredited)
 I Demand Payment (1938) – District Attorney
 Torchy Gets Her Man (1938) – Henchman Stoneham (uncredited)
 Nancy Drew... Detective (1938) – Adam Thorne
 Kentucky (1938) – Man at Race Track (uncredited)
 Stand Up and Fight (1939) – Donnelly (uncredited)
 Devil's Island (1939) – Duval, Camp Doctor
 Wings of the Navy (1939) – Psychology Examiner (uncredited)
 Three Smart Girls Grow Up (1939) – Stock Broker (uncredited)
 The Story of Alexander Graham Bell (1939) – Banker at Demo (uncredited)
 Mr. Moto in Danger Island (1939) – Washington Official (uncredited)
 Frontier Pony Express (1939) – Senator Calhoun Lassister
 Confessions of a Nazi Spy (1939) – FBI Agent (uncredited)
 Union Pacific (1939) – Man (uncredited)
 Ex-Champ (1939) – Clerk (uncredited)
 My Wife's Relatives (1939) – Jarvis
 The Sun Never Sets (1939) – DNXY Radio Operator (uncredited)
 They All Come Out (1939) – Social Service Director (uncredited)
 When Tomorrow Comes (1939) – Man Announcing End Of Strike (uncredited)
 Chicken Wagon Family (1939) – Bank Manager (uncredited)
 The Angels Wash Their Faces (1939) – Defense Attorney (uncredited)
 Rio (1939) – Mr. Albert (uncredited)
 The Escape (1939) – Captain of Detectives (uncredited)
 The Roaring Twenties (1939) – Henderson
 Heroes in Blue (1939) – Moran
 The Big Guy (1939) – Lait (uncredited)
 The Green Hornet (1940, Serial) – Williams [Ch. 13] (uncredited)
 The Man Who Wouldn't Talk (1940) – Warden (uncredited)
Hidden Enemy (1940) – Newspaper Editor
 I Take This Woman (1940) – Dr. Harrison (uncredited)
 Charlie Chan in Panama (1940) – Dr. Fredericks
 Virginia City (1940) – Officer (uncredited)
 Midnight Limited (1940) – Capt. Harrigan
 And One Was Beautiful (1940) – Prosecuting Attorney (uncredited)
 'Til We Meet Again (1940) – Ship Officer (uncredited)
 Edison, the Man (1940) – Lecturer (uncredited)
 A Fugitive from Justice (1940) – Partridge
 Winners of the West (1940, Serial) – John Hartford
 Sailor's Lady (1940) – Captain's Aide (uncredited)
 The Golden Fleecing (1940) – Barney – Fender's Lawyer (uncredited)
 Money and the Woman (1940) – Mr. Kaiser
 City for Conquest (1940) – Gaul
 A Dispatch from Reuters (1940) – Reporter (uncredited)
 The Son of Monte Cristo (1940) – Turnkey
 Ride, Kelly, Ride (1941) – Steward (uncredited)
 Road Show (1941) – Newton (uncredited)
 Meet John Doe (1941) – Relief Administrator (uncredited)
 Knockout (1941) – Indianapolis Athletic Commission Official (uncredited)
 Men of Boys Town (1941) – District Attorney (scenes deleted)
 South of Panama (1941) – Colonel Stoddard
 Her First Beau (1941) – Mr. Wharton (uncredited)
 Broadway Limited (1941) – Man Reading Newspaper (uncredited)
 Blossoms in the Dust (1941) – Second Businessman (uncredited)
 Double Cross (1941) – Commissioner Bob Trent
 Sergeant York (1941) – Oscar of the Waldorf (uncredited)
 They Meet Again (1941) – Prosecuting Attorney (uncredited)
 Harmon of Michigan (1941) – City Editor (uncredited)
 Riders of the Timberline (1941) – Preston Yates
 Sea Raiders (1941, Serial) – Elliott Carlton [Chs. 1–7]
 Blues in the Night (1941) – Drunk Saying, 'It's a Scream' (uncredited)
 They Died with Their Boots On (1941) – Congressman (uncredited)
 Man with Two Lives (1942) – Dr. Richard Clark
 Kid Glove Killer (1942) – Forsythe – Second Politician (uncredited)
 Who Is Hope Schuyler? (1942) – Judge
 Yankee Doodle Dandy (1942) – Critic #2 (uncredited)
 I Live on Danger (1942) – Chief Investigator E.G. Lambert (uncredited)
 The Old Homestead (1942) – Inspector O'Brien (uncredited)
 Wildcat (1942) – Oil Investor (uncredited)
 Who Done It? (1942) – Carter (uncredited)
 Pittsburgh (1942) – Headwaiter (uncredited)
 The Traitor Within (1942) – Davis
 Ice-Capades Revue (1942) – Gabby Haskoff (uncredited)
 The Adventures of Smilin' Jack (1943, Serial) – Hon. George Hill [Chs. 8–12] (uncredited)
 G-Men vs. the Black Dragon (1943) – Gordon (uncredited)
 It Comes Up Love (1943) – Headwaiter (uncredited)
 Truck Busters (1943) – Elliott
 Submarine Alert (1943) – J.D. Deerhold's Boss (uncredited)
 Let's Have Fun (1943) – James Bradley
 Mission to Moscow (1943) – Isolationist (uncredited)
 A Stranger in Town (1943) – Blaxton's Lawyer
 Dr. Gillespie's Criminal Case (1943) – Stiles (uncredited)
 I Escaped from the Gestapo (1943) – Domack – Head of Gestapo Gang
 The Good Fellows (1943) – Brother Lewis (uncredited)
 Someone to Remember (1943) – College Trustee (uncredited)
 Sweet Rosie O'Grady (1943) – Little (uncredited)
 Government Girl (1943) – Irate Man (uncredited)
 Death Valley Manhunt (1943) – Ross (uncredited)
 Klondike Kate (1943) – Sullivan (uncredited)
 The Song of Bernadette (1943) – Policeman (uncredited)
 California Joe (1943) – Gov. Glynn (uncredited)
 Sing a Jingle (1944) – Philip Jonas (uncredited)
 Captain America (1944, Serial) – Agent 33 [Ch. 15]
 Voodoo Man (1944) – District Attorney (uncredited)
 The Navy Way (1944) – Randall Guest (uncredited)
 The Lady and the Monster (1944) – Manning (uncredited)
 Bermuda Mystery (1944) – Police Inspector (uncredited)
 A Night of Adventure (1944) – Assistant District Attorney (uncredited)
 Take It Big (1944) – Customer (uncredited)
 Goodnight, Sweetheart (1944) – Trial Judge (uncredited)
 South of Dixie (1944) – Mr. Platt
 A Fig Leaf for Eve (1944) – Horace Sardham
 Wilson (1944) – Hughes Campaign Orator (uncredited)
 When Strangers Marry (1944) – Middle – Aged Husband on Train
 Haunted Harbor (1944, Serial) – Fredrick Vorhees [Ch. 1]
 One Mysterious Night (1944) – Police Commissioner Howard (uncredited)
 Rogues' Gallery (1944) – Gentry – City Editor
 Nothing but Trouble (1944) – Police Chief Smith (uncredited)
 Fashion Model (1945) – Jacques Duval
 Boston Blackie Booked on Suspicion (1945) – Dr. Barclay (uncredited)
 Nob Hill (1945) – Politician (uncredited)
 Scarlet Street (1945) – Detective (uncredited)
 Colonel Effingham's Raid (1946) – Dr. Evans (uncredited)
 Night Editor (1946) – Police Chief Burns (uncredited)
 If I'm Lucky (1946) – Golfer (uncredited)
 Roll on Texas Moon (1946) – Frank B. Wilson
 Angel on My Shoulder (1946) – Prison Yard Captain (uncredited)
 Sister Kenny (1946) – Reporter (uncredited)
 The Jolson Story (1946) – Winter Garden Director (uncredited)
 Out California Way (1946) – E.J. Pearson
 Boston Blackie and the Law (1946) – Andrews, Bank Manager (uncredited)
 It's a Wonderful Life (1946) – Tom (Bldg. & Loan)
 Trail to San Antone (1947) – Sheriff Jones
 Calendar Girl (1947) – Battalion Chief (uncredited)
 Undercover Maisie (1947) – Police Chief (uncredited)
 Saddle Pals (1947) – Doctor (uncredited)
 The Perils of Pauline (1947) – Bond Buyer (uncredited)
 The Unfinished Dance (1947) – Clock Customer (uncredited)
 Key Witness (1947) – Police Chief Crandall (uncredited)
 The Invisible Wall (1947) – Marty Floyd
 On the Old Spanish Trail (1947) – Mr. Burnett (uncredited)
 Desire Me (1947) – The Baker (uncredited)
 The Hat Box Mystery (1947) – District Attorney
 Roses Are Red (1947) – Jim Locke
 The Judge Steps Out (1948) – Judge (uncredited)
 The Gallant Blade (1948) – Admiral Breeze (uncredited)
 Chicken Every Sunday (1949) – Joe (uncredited)
 The Lucky Stiff (1949) – Headwaiter (uncredited)
 Hellfire (1949) – Edwards (uncredited)
 It Happens Every Spring (1949) – Jack Bell (uncredited)
 Madame Bovary (1949) – Presiding Judge (uncredited)
 The Story of Seabiscuit (1949) – The $15K Bidder (uncredited)
 The Baron of Arizona (1950) – Surveyor General Miller
 A Woman of Distinction (1950) – Police Desk Sergeant (uncredited)
 The Good Humor Man (1950) – Doctor (uncredited)
 The Invisible Monster (1950) – Warren Madison (uncredited)
 Twilight in the Sierras (1950) – Judge Wiggins
 A Modern Marriage (1950) – Dr. Connors
 Belle Le Grand (1951) – Carter (uncredited)
 Show Boat (1951) – Hotel Manager (uncredited)
 Deadline – U.S.A. (1952) – Mr. Blake, Mrs. Garrison's Lawyer (uncredited)
 The Court-Martial of Billy Mitchell (1955) – Court-Martial Judge (uncredited)

References

External links

1884 births
1959 deaths
20th-century American male actors
American male film actors
Male actors from New York City